The 2003 Grand Valley State Lakers football team was an American football team that won the 2003 NCAA Division II national championship.

The team represented the Grand Valley State University in the Great Lakes Intercollegiate Athletic Conference (GLIAC) during the 2003 NCAA Division II football season. In their 13th season under head coach Brian Kelly, the Lakers compiled a 14–1 record (9–1 against conference opponents), outscored opponents by a total of 551 to 200, and finished second in the GLIAC. The team advanced to the playoffs and won the national championship by defeating North Dakota in the championship game.

The team played its home games at Lubbers Stadium in Allendale Charter Township, Michigan.

Schedule

References

Grand Valley State
Grand Valley State Lakers football seasons
NCAA Division II Football Champions
Grand Valley State Lakers football